Euochin is a genus of east Asian jumping spiders first described by Jerzy Prószyński in 2018. The genus was split off from Euophrys. Prószyński placed the genus in his informal group "euophrydeae" within the "euophryines", the latter being equivalent to the tribe Euophryini, which is part of the subfamily Salticinae.

Species
 it contains eleven species:
Euochin albopalpalis (Bao & Peng, 2002) — China, Taiwan
Euochin atrata (Song & Chai, 1992) — China
Euochin bulbus (Bao & Peng, 2002) — China, Taiwan
Euochin kororensis (Berry, Beatty & Prószyński, 1996) — Micronesia (Caroline Is.)
Euochin luzonica Logunov, 2020 — Philippines (Luzon)
Euochin mii Wang & Li, 2022 — China
Euochin poloi (Zabka, 1985) — Vietnam
Euochin subwanyan (Wang & Li, 2020) — China
Euochin tangi Wang & Li, 2022 — China
Euochin wanyan (Berry, Beatty & Prószyński, 1996) — Micronesia (Caroline Is.)
Euochin yaoi Wang & Li, 2021 — China

References

Salticidae genera
Salticidae